Joseph Casey Cox (born July 3, 1941) is a retired American professional baseball player who pitched in the Major Leagues between  and  for the Washington Senators/Texas Rangers and New York Yankees. He was born in Long Beach, California, and attended Long Beach City College and California State University, Los Angeles.

Cox entered baseball in 1962 as a member of the Cincinnati Reds' organization, then was drafted in successive years by the Cleveland Indians (1963) and Senators (1964). In the majors, he was essentially a relief pitcher, coming out of the bullpen in all but 59 of his 308 career MLB games pitched. In , as a rookie, he appeared in a career-high 66 games and was credited with seven saves, also a personal best. 

His finest season was  — the 1961–1971 Senators' only winning campaign in 11 seasons in Washington. Working in 52 games, with 13 starts, he set career marks in games won (12) and earned run average (2.78, in 171 innings pitched). He handled 32 chances in the field without an error, leading all American League pitchers in fielding percentage. He also threw a career-high four complete games. The following season, Cox was almost exclusively a starting pitcher. But he won only eight of 20 decisions and his ERA climbed to 4.45, as Washington faltered and finished last in the American League East. In  he returned to the Senator bullpen and tied his career-best with seven saves, but Washington struggled again on the field and at the turnstiles, and the franchise was moved to Dallas–Fort Worth as the Texas Rangers during the offseason. In , Cox appeared in 45 games for the first edition of the Rangers before his trade on August 31 to the Yankees.

He would pitch in only six total games for the Yankees, five at the tail end of 1972, and then on Opening Day  at Fenway Park, when he worked three innings of mop-up relief in a 15–5 Red Sox victory that marked the first game in which a designated hitter was used in the American League. He retired from baseball after the 1973 campaign.

Over the course of Cox' MLB career, he posted a 39–42 won–lost record, 20 saves, five complete games, and an earned run average of 3.70. In 762 innings pitched, he permitted 772 hits and 234 bases on balls, with 297 strikeouts.

References

External links

1941 births
Living people
Baseball players from Long Beach, California
Buffalo Bisons (minor league) players
Burlington Indians players (1958–1964)
Cal State Los Angeles Golden Eagles baseball players
California State University, Los Angeles alumni
Charleston Indians players
Florida Instructional League Senators players
Hawaii Islanders players
Long Beach City Vikings baseball players
Major League Baseball pitchers
New York Yankees players
Peninsula Senators players
Rocky Mount Leafs players
Rocky Mount Senators players
Texas Rangers players
Tiburones de La Guaira players
American expatriate baseball players in Venezuela
Washington Senators (1961–1971) players
Wichita Aeros players
York White Roses players